Sachin Joab is an Australian actor. He took an interest in acting during primary school and attended various acting schools and workshops. Since graduating from the National Theatre, Joab has appeared in several films and television, including City Homicide, Rush, My Year Without Sex, 10 Terrorists, and Conspiracy 365. In 2011, Joab successfully auditioned for the recurring role of Ajay Kapoor in the soap opera Neighbours. He was later promoted to the main cast. Joab left the show in May 2013. The actor has since appeared in SBS miniseries Better Man and feature film Lion.

Early life 
Joab was born in Melbourne, Victoria. His parents divorced when he was five years old. Joab became interested in acting during primary school when he was around seven or eight. He told Tanu Kallivayalil from the Indus Age, "My parents like a lot of Indian parents wanted me to do something credible. But I did not want to become a lawyer or doctor or something like that. I wanted to do something that I was passionate about. In fact, I just finished high school because I did not want to make my mum sad."

Joab then attended various acting schools and workshops, before he moved to New York to study at the Actors Studio. Joab, who spent his childhood imitating the voices of characters he watched on television, did not need to undergo accent training. On his return to Australia, Joab joined the National Theatre, graduating three years later. He then began appearing in films and theatre productions, before being signed to an agent.

Career 
In 2008, Joab made a guest appearance as Raj in the City Homicide episode  "Examination Day". Joab had to put on an Indian accent for the part. The following year, he appeared in an episode of Rush and in the film My Year Without Sex. 2011 saw Joab cast in Big Mamma's Boy and Winston Furlong's Taj, alongside his future Neighbours co-star Coco Cherian. Joab was also cast as Judge Miki Miraj in Dee McLachlan's black comedy 10 Terrorists.

Joab joined the cast of Neighbours as Ajay Kapoor in 2011 following a successful audition. On 7 December 2011, it was announced that Joab had been promoted to the regular cast and his on-screen family were being introduced. Following the announcement, several racist posts left on the Neighbours website had to be removed. Speaking to Paul Tatnell from the Herald Sun, Joab blamed the racism on a "lack of education". He elaborated "There is various pockets that will say it is un-Australian to have an Indian or an Indian family on Ramsay St. Those Aussies who are saying it is un-Australian will be the same ones who pretty much supported the White Australia policy back in the day, you are never going to get away from that kind of stuff." Joab left Neighbours at the end of his contract in May 2013 to pursue acting work in Los Angeles.

Joab starred in the twelve-part series Conspiracy 365 as Bruno in 2012. He also appeared as Inspector Ramesh in the SBS four-part miniseries Better Man, which began airing from 25 July 2013. That same year, he filmed a role in the 2014 film The Legend Maker. Joab made a guest appearance in Childhood's Endin 2015. He was also cast in the drama film Lion, alongside Rooney Mara and Dev Patel. In April 2016, Joab spoke out about having to put on an Indian accent when he attends auditions in Australia. That same year, Joab played the lead role of Amir Kapoor in the Sydney Theatre Company (STC) production of Disgraced. He was invited to audition for the part after the STC director of programming saw him on Neighbours.

Filmography

References

External links 

1978 births
Living people
Male actors from Melbourne
Australian people of Indian descent
Australian male soap opera actors
21st-century Australian male actors